David Reynolds,  (born 17 February 1952) is a British historian. He is Emeritus Professor of International History at Cambridge University and a Fellow of Christ's College, Cambridge. He attended school at Dulwich College on a scholarship and studied at Cambridge and Harvard Universities. He has held visiting posts at Harvard, Nebraska and Oklahoma, as well as at Nihon University in Tokyo and Sciences Po in Paris. 

Reynolds was awarded the Wolfson History Prize, 2005, and elected a Fellow of the British Academy in 2005. His research and writing specialise in the two world wars and the Cold War. He served as Chairman of the History Faculty at Cambridge in 2013-15 and retired from University teaching in 2019. He has served on academic advisory boards for the redevelopment of the Imperial War Museum First World War Galleries (2011-14) and Second World War Galleries (since 2016). In 2021, he succeeded Roger Knight as President of Cambridge University Cricket Club.

Documentaries
Reynolds has made thirteen documentaries on 20th-century history for the BBC, most recently the three-part BBC2 series Long Shadow, based on his award-winning book about the legacies and memory of 1914–18 and a trilogy of films about the Big Three allies in the Second World War: World War Two: 1941 and the Man of Steel, World War Two: 1942 and Hitler's Soft Underbelly and World War Two: 1945 and the Wheelchair President. All these films have been directed by Russell Barnes. 

Reynolds was also the writer and presenter of the award-winning ninety-part series America, Empire of Liberty, broadcast on BBC Radio 4.

Personal life
Reynolds is married with one son.

Awards and honours
2004 Wolfson History Prize, In Command of History
2005 Fellow of the British Academy
2014 Hessell-Tiltman Prize, The Long Shadow

Books
1981: The Creation of the Anglo-American Alliance, 1937–1941: a Study in Competitive Co-operation (1981) University of North Carolina Press  (Awarded the Bernath Prize by the Society for Historians of American Foreign Relations, 1982)
1988: An Ocean Apart: the Relationship between Britain and America in the 20th Century – co-author David Dimbleby. Hodder & Stoughton  (Linked to BBC/PBS TV series.)
1991: Britannia Over-ruled: British Policy and World Power in the 20th Century. Longman 
1994: Allies at War: the Soviet, American and British Experience 1939–1945 (Franklin and Eleanor Roosevelt Institute Series on Diplomatic and Economic History). (Co-edited with Warren F. Kimball and A. O. Chubarian). Palgrave Macmillan 
1994: The Origins of the Cold War in Europe: International Perspectives (editor). Yale University Press 
1995: Rich Relations: the American Occupation of Britain, 1942–1945. Random House  (Awarded the US Society for Military History's Distinguished Book Award, 1996)
2000: One World Divisible: a Global History since 1945.. Allen Lane 
2001: From Munich to Pearl Harbor: Roosevelt's America and the Origins of the Second World War. Ivan R. Dee 
2004: In Command of History: Churchill Fighting and Writing the Second World War. Random House  (Awarded the Wolfson History Prize, 2004)
2005: Christ's: a Cambridge College Over Five Centuries (editor). Macmillan 
2006: From World War to Cold War: Churchill, Roosevelt, and the International History of the 1940s. Oxford University Press 
2007: Summits: Six Meetings That Shaped the Twentieth Century. Allen Lane 
2008: FDR's World: War, Peace, and Legacies. (Co-edited with David B. Woolner and Warren F. Kimball) Palgrave Macmillan  
2009: America, Empire of Liberty: A New History. David Reynolds 
2013: The Long Shadow: The Great War and the Twentieth Century. Simon & Schuster UK ; W. W. Norton, 2014 US  (Awarded the Hessell-Tiltman Prize, 2014)
2016: Transcending the Cold War: Summits, Statecraft, and the Dissolution of Bipolarity in Europe, 1970–1990. (Co-edited with Kristina Spohr) Oxford University Press 
2018: The Kremlin Letters: Stalin's Wartime Correspondence with Churchill and Roosevelt, with Vladimir Pechatnov. Yale University Press  (Awarded the Link-Kuehl Prize by the Society for Historians of American Foreign Relations, 2020)
2019: Island Stories: Britain and its History in the Age of Brexit Harper Collins

Broadcasting (as writer and presenter)
2004: Churchill's Forgotten Years – BBC 4/BBC 2
2004: The Improbable Mr Attlee – BBC 4
2008: Summits – three-part series: (1) Munich, 1938; (2) Vienna, 1961; (3) Geneva, 1985 – BBC 4
2008: Armistice – BBC2 (Grierson Award: Best Historical Documentary, runner-up)
2008–09: America, Empire of Liberty – BBC Radio 4 (90-part series, accompanying the writer's 2009 book) (Voice of the Listener & Viewer Award for the Best New Radio Programme of 2008; Sony Radio Academy Award, Nomination, 2009; Orwell Prize, Shortlist, 2010)
2010: Nixon in the Den – BBC 4
2011: World War Two: 1941 and the Man of Steel – BBC 4 (Grierson Award: Best Historical Documentary, Nomination)
2012: World War Two: 1942 and Hitler's Soft Underbelly – BBC 4
2014: The Long Shadow – three-part series: (1) Remembering and Understanding; (2) Ballots and Bullets; (3) Us and Them – BBC 2
2015: World War Two: 1945 and the Wheelchair President – BBC 4
2016: Verdun: The Sacred Wound BBC Radio 4 (2-part series: (1) The Battle; (2) Loss and Legacy) 
2017: Balfour's Promised Land BBC Radio 4 - on the centenary of the Balfour Declaration

References

External links

 Professor David Reynolds - Fellows of the British Academy
 
Lecture: , via the official channel of Gresham College, UK

Living people
English historians
English television presenters
Harvard University alumni
Fellows of Christ's College, Cambridge
University of Nebraska–Lincoln faculty
University of Oklahoma faculty
Harvard University staff
Fellows of the British Academy
People educated at Dulwich College
1952 births
Members of the University of Cambridge faculty of history